Mount Ōkueyama (大崩山), also known as Mount Ōkue, is a volcanic mountain on the Japanese island of Kyushu. Part of an ancient volcanic formation known as the Okueyama Volcano-plutonic Complex, Mount Ōkueyama (and possibly several nearby volcanoes) experienced a massive eruption ~13.7 million years before present (13.7 Ma); it has been postulated that this eruption measured 8.0 on the Volcanic Explosivity Index, making the Ōkueyama eruption larger than any eruption in recorded history. The mountain is now considered to be extinct.

In 1990, the area around the mountain was designated a Forest Ecosystem Reserve, and In 2017 Mount Ōkueyama was declared part of a UNESCO biosphere reserve, the Sobo, Katamuki and Okue Biosphere Reserve.

The area is managed by the Forestry Agency of Japan.

See also 
 List of mountains in Japan
 List of volcanoes in Japan

References 

Volcanoes of Kyushu#Okueyama, Mount
Okueyama, Mount
Biosphere reserves of Japan
Okueyama, Mount
Okueyama, Mount